Kalateh-ye Abdol may refer to:
 Kalateh-ye Abdol, Mashhad, Razavi Khorasan Province
 Kalateh-ye Abdol, Torqabeh and Shandiz, Razavi Khorasan Province
 Kalateh-ye Abdol, Semnan